Armagh railway station was a railway station that served Armagh in County Armagh, Northern Ireland.

Development
The Ulster Railway opened Armagh station in 1848, linking the city with Belfast. The Ulster Railway was extended from Armagh to Monaghan in 1858 and Clones in 1863.

The Newry and Armagh Railway (N&A) opened in 1864, and had its own temporary terminus just outside Armagh until it started using the Ulster Railway station in 1865.

The Castleblayney, Keady and Armagh Railway (CK&A) was completed in 1910. In 1876 the Ulster Railway became part of the new Great Northern Railway (GNR), which took over the N&A in 1879 and the CKA in 1911.

Rail disaster

The Armagh rail disaster, which killed 80 people and injured 260, occurred on 12 June 1889 on the N&A line near Armagh. An excursion train had to climb a steep gradient, but the locomotive stalled. The crew decided to divide the train but when they did the rear portion had inadequate brake power and ran back down the gradient, colliding with a following train. Most of the eighty people killed were women. It was previously thought that more children were killed, but most children were saved by jumping out of windows.

Decline and closure
The partition of Ireland in 1922 hastened the railways' decline, and the GNR closed the Keady – Castleblayney section of the CKA in 1923. The GNR withdrew passenger trains from the Armagh – Keady section of the CKA in 1932 and closed the Armagh – Markethill section of the N&A in 1933.

Routes

Proposals
As of 2013, it was reported that a future reopened railway line to Portadown was under consideration. Then minister for Northern Ireland's Department for Regional Development, Danny Kennedy, indicated possible railway restoration plans. In proposals, published in 2014, the Armagh Line was also included in a list of potential projects.

References

 
 

Disused railway stations in County Armagh
Railway stations opened in 1848
Railway stations closed in 1957
Buildings and structures in Armagh (city)
Proposed railway stations in Northern Ireland
1848 establishments in Ireland
1957 disestablishments in Northern Ireland

Railway stations in Northern Ireland opened in 1848